The K-5 truck is a light automobile truck with a  wheelbase, standard automobile gauge, and  wheels; length from front of radiator to rear of body ; equipped with single top; formerly marked with the Signal Corps emblem and the words "Signal Corps, U.S. Army" and also with the name "Maintenance truck No.5" or "Tender for radio tractor No.3" .

See also
List of Signal Corps Vehicles
K-1 wire cart
K-2 Lance wagon
K-3 wire cart
K-4 signal cart
K-8 cart
Radio tractor

References

External links
Radionerds

Military trucks of the United States